Conference of Catholic Bishops of the Russian Federation is a collective body of the national church and the administration of the Roman Catholic Church in Russia. Established and approved on March 2, 1999.

Plenary

Plenary sessions of the Conference held twice a year.

Chairmen

Chairman may be elected one of the bishops. The President is elected for a term of 3 years. Hold the post can be no more than two consecutive terms.

Archbishop Tadeusz Kondrusiewicz, from 1999 to 2005

Bishop Joseph Werth, from 2005 to 2011

Archbishop Paolo Pezzi from 2011 to 2017

Bishop Clemens Pickel since 2017

Composition

The structure consists of the four dioceses bishops in the territory of Russia, and the Secretary General of the Conference. At present, their members include:

 Archbishop Paolo Pezzi; Chairman;

 Bishop Joseph Werth, vice-chairman

 Bishop Clemens Pickel, 

 Bishop Cyryl Klimowicz;

 Auxiliary Bishop Nicolai Dubinin

 Priest Stefan Lipke, Secretary-General

Structure

The Liturgical Commission

Commission on the Laity, and youth movements

Catechetical Commission

The Commission for Cooperation with public authorities

Commission for the Family

The Commission for pastoral activities and vocations

The Commission for inter-Christian and interreligious dialogue and dialogue with non-believers

Commission on social and charitable activities

Catholic martyrs of Russia

On January 30, 2002, the Conference of Catholic Bishops of Russia adopted a program of "Catholic martyrs of Russia", in which are studies of life and death of the Servants of God - candidates for the promotion to beatified (beatification).

See also
Catholic Church in Russia
Episcopal conference

References

External links
 http://www.catholic.su/node/19
 http://www.sova-center.ru/religion/news/intraconfessional/other-religions/2005/01/d3353/
 http://www.vsp.ru/social/2000/11/30/344635
 http://www.gcatholic.org/dioceses/conference/090.htm
 http://www.catholic-hierarchy.org/country/ru.html 

Russia
Catholic Church in Russia
Christian organizations established in 1999
1999 establishments in Russia